Golyshmanovo is an urban locality (work settlement) and the administrative center of Golyshmanovsky District of Tyumen Oblast, Russia. Population:

References

Notes

Sources

Urban-type settlements in Tyumen Oblast